Voina may refer to:

 Voina, a Russian street-art group known for their provocative and politically charged works of performance art
 Voina, a Russian film "Война", Russian for war

Family name 
 Radu Voina (born 1950), Romanian handball player and head coach
  (1887–1960) Romanian politician and diplomat, mayor of Iași

See also 
 Voicu
 Voinea
 Voineasa (disambiguation)
 Voinești (disambiguation)